General elections were held in Mexico in 1871. In the presidential election, no candidate received more than 50% of the popular vote, resulting in Congress electing the winner. Having received 48% of the popular vote, incumbent president Benito Juárez was elected by Congress with 108 of the 116 votes cast. Following the elections, losing candidate Porfirio Díaz launched a rebellion.

Results

President

References

Mexico
General
Presidential elections in Mexico
Election and referendum articles with incomplete results